Eli Baxter (born 1954) is a Canadian writer, who won the Governor General's Award for English-language non-fiction at the 2022 Governor General's Awards for his memoir Aki-wayn-zih: A Person as Worthy as the Earth.

Baxter, an Anishinaabe member of the Marten Falls First Nation and a survivor of the Canadian Indian residential school system, he has taught indigenous language and culture at both the elementary school and university levels, most notably at the University of Western Ontario.

References

1954 births
21st-century Canadian non-fiction writers
21st-century Canadian male writers
21st-century First Nations writers
Canadian male non-fiction writers
Canadian memoirists
Ojibwe people
Academic staff of the University of Western Ontario
Living people